Oridathoru Postman is a 2010 Malayalam comedy film directed by Shaji Aziz. The movie features Kunchacko Boban, Innocent, Sharath Kumar and Meera Nandan in the lead roles. Boban as a postman in this film was featured in a Kannada textbook.

Plot
Raghunandan is a native of Chenankuzhi village and the son of Gangadharan, the village postman. Gangadharan is a lazy man and does not do his duties well. Raghu has to face the anger of the villagers because his father does not deliver the mails or money orders in time.

Raghu on the other hand is a hard working young man and does any help to the villagers. He is in love with Usha, a student in the PSC exam coaching class where he does part-time teaching. Raghu also plays the mediator in most of the village's major issues. In one such attempt, he meets Yasin Mubarak and this meeting changes his life forever.

Cast

Production
The film was mainly shot at various locations in Thodupuzha. The background score of this movie is copied from film Road to Perdition.

References

2010 films
2010s Malayalam-language films

Indian comedy films
Indian drama films